The chestnut-backed buttonquail (Turnix castanotus) is a species of bird in the family Turnicidae. It is endemic to Australia.

Taxonomy
English zoologist George Gray placed it in the genus Turnix in 1870. William Robert Ogilvie-Grant corrected the name to Turnix castanonota in 1889. Three subspecies were described by Gregory Mathews, but all are now considered as invalid and merely individual variants.

Etymology
"Chestnut-backed buttonquail" has been designated the official name by the International Ornithologists' Union (IOC). The species name is derived from the Ancient Greek words kastanon "chestnut" and noton "back". Gould called it "chestnut-backed hemipode" in 1848, noting the colonists called it "thick-billed quail". The buttonquail species were generally known as "quail" (hence "chestnut-backed quail" ) until the RAOU promoted the current usage of "buttonquail" in 1978, which was then universally adopted.

Distribution and habitat
Native to northern Australia, the species ranges from the Dampier Peninsula in Western Australia across to Westmoreland Station in the Gulf Country of northwestern Queensland, with possible records from Gregory Downs and Augustus Downs further east. It is also native to Melville Island and Groote Eylandt. It was common around Borroloola and McArthur River, but not currently. Its existence in Queensland was only confirmed in 2020.

Its natural habitats are low grasslands and Eucalyptus forests and woodland, favouring quartzite-sandstone ridges, plateaus and escarpments, mostly (but not always) in areas that receive over  summer rainfall.

Behaviour
The usual sex roles are reversed in the buttonquail genus (Turnix), as the larger and more brightly-coloured female mates with multiple male partners and leaves them to incubate the eggs. The female lays a clutch of 1–5 (usually 4) pyriform eggs, which are glossy-white with sparse small dark blotches.

References

Birds of the Northern Territory
Birds of Queensland
Birds of Western Australia
Turnix
Birds described in 1840
Taxa named by John Gould